Hovslätts IK is a Swedish football club located in Jönköping.

Background
Hovslätts Idrottsklubb was formed in 1929 as a sports club serving the settlement of Hovslätt in Jönköping Municipality. The club has sections covering football, bandy, floorball, gymnastics and athletics.

Since their foundation, Hovslätts IK has participated mainly in the lower divisions of the Swedish football league system.  The club currently plays in Division 3 Nordöstra Götaland which is the fifth tier of Swedish football. They play their home matches at the Hovet in Jönköping.

Hovslätts IK is affiliated to Smålands Fotbollförbund.

Recent history
In recent seasons Hovslätts IK has competed in the following divisions:

2011 - Division III, Nordöstra Götaland
2010 - Division IV, Småland Elit Västra
2009 - Division IV, Småland Elit Västra
2008 - Division IV, Småland Elit Västra
2007 - Division III, Nordöstra Götaland
2006 - Division IV, Småland Norra Elit
2005 - Division IV, Småland Västra Elit
2004 - Division IV, Småland Västra Elit
2003 - Division IV, Småland Nordvästra
2002 - Division V, Småland Nordvästra
2001 - Division V, Småland Nordvästra
2000 - Division V, Småland Nordvästra
1999 - Division V, Småland Nordvästra

Attendances

In recent seasons Hovslätts IK has had the following average attendances:

Footnotes

External links 
 Hovslätts IK - Official website
 Hovslätts IK Facebook

Football clubs in Jönköping County
Association football clubs established in 1929
1929 establishments in Sweden